Knuthenborg Safaripark is a safari park on the island of Lolland in the southeast of Denmark. It is located 7 km (on Rte 289) to the north of Maribo, near Bandholm. It is one of Lolland's major tourist attractions with over 250,000 visitors annually, and is the largest safari park in northern Europe. It is also the largest natural playground for both children and adults in Denmark. Among others, it houses an arboretum, aviaries, a drive-through safari park, a monkey forest (with baboons, tamarins and lemurs) and a tiger enclosure. The park is viewable on Google Street View.

History
The park is set in Knuthenborg, previously known as the medieval manor of Årsmarke, which was Denmark's largest private estate. In 1714, it became part of the new county of Knuthenborg. The park has its origins in 1867 when Eggert Christoffer Knuth (1838-1874) built a sturdy  wall around his property with stones fished out of the Smålandsfarvandet. He then hired English landscape architect Edward Milner who, on the basis of plans completed in 1870, laid out a park for his world collection of rare botanical plants as well as the many rhododendrons which are also a great attraction to tourists. There are several hundred species of exotic shrubs and trees. In 1926, the park became protected under a preservation order. An enclosed zoological garden was established in 1950 adjacent to Swan Lake (Svanesøen) with 70 deer. In 1969, Count Adam W. Knuth added the first exotic animals to the park; antelopes, plains zebras and ostriches were the first to be acquired from Kenya followed by white rhinos. It is now a famous zoo of Denmark.

Features

Over the past 40 years, the number of animals in the park has grown to about a thousand of more than 40 different species. Antelopes, Bactrian camels, giraffes, white rhinoceroses, and plains zebras are some of the animals on view in the Safaripark. The park features include an arboretum, aviaries (21 of them), and tiger enclosure. Most of the Safaripark is bicycle-friendly, though the savannah is accessible only by those in a vehicle (own car or a safari bus). An adventure playground affords a play area for children. A railway line operates in summer between the entrance of the park to Maribo. In the areas with domestic animals, visitors can touch the animals if they allow it.

The threatened Arctic wolf, also known as the polar or white wolf, is housed in the park where it breeds regularly.

Tourism
In 2012, there were some 223,000 visitors to Knuthenborg Safari Park representing a 10% increase over the previous year. The increase has been ascribed to new attractions and facilities for children. The Safari Park was placed 29 in the official list of Danish Tourist Attractions in 2011.

The park is open to visitors every day during the spring, summer and fall, but closed in winter.

References

External links

Official site

Safari parks
Tourist attractions in Denmark
Parks in Denmark
Zoos in Denmark
Tourist attractions in Region Zealand
Buildings and structures associated with the Knuth family